The Marshal of the Holy Roman Church and Sacred Conclave was a hereditary official in the Pontifical Household before Pope Paul VI's reform of the papal court in his motu proprio Pontificalis Domus of 1968.  It was vested in Prince Chigi, prince of Farnese, Campagnano, etc., etc.  During the conclave, the Marshal had the ceremonial duty of sealing the doors to the Sistine Chapel from the outside.

Officials of the Roman Curia
Nobles of the Holy See